María Padín (September 15, 1888 – December 21, 1970) was a Uruguayan film, radio, and theater actress and producer who had a successful career in Argentina.

Career
The daughter of circus actors  (the clown Padín el 77) and Eulalia Mendizábal (trapeze artist), María Padín had a sister from this marriage named Aída Padín, who would later marry Francisco Aniceto Benavente and give her a nephew, Saulo Benavente, a painter, illuminator, and scenographer. Her sister-in-law was the actress Raquel Oquendo.

In radio, she was the first actress of the Radio-Teatrales Argentinas companies of Ricardo Migueres and Ricardo Bustamante.

Her appearance in cinema occurred very early, starring alongside leading figures of the golden age of Argentine cinema, including , Azucena Maizani, Floren Delbene, Santiago Arrieta, Homero Cárpena, Pedro Aleandro, and Domingo Sapelli. In Chile she acted in several historical silent films with her husband Arturo Mario as director.

In addition to her career on the big screen, Padín had several roles in theatrical revues. After this dissolved, she settled for a few years in Chile and returned to form her own comedy company with advice from Dr. Oscar R. Beltrán. With this company she toured locations such as Valparaíso, Mendoza, and Lima.

She was a great friend of the actress Herminia Mancini, sister of Julia Mancini, with whom she worked in theater.

Personal life
Padín was married to the Italian actor and theatrical and film director Arturo Mario, with whom she moved to Chile in 1917, starring in several of his films.

Filmography

 1915: Nobleza gaucha
 1917: 
 1917: El fusilamiento de Dorrego
 1918: Todo por la Patria (or Jirón de la bandera)
 1918: La avenida de las acacias
 1920: Manuel Rodríguez
 1939:

Radio

Theater
 Los espantajos (1915), by 
 La viuda influyente (1915), by Belisardo Roldán
 Los paraísos artificiales (1915), by 
 La novia de Floripondio (1915)
 Silvio Torcelli (1915)
 La suerte perra and Crisis matrimonial, by Casals
 La vuelta de Braulio (1915)
 El zonda (1915)
 El rancho de las violetas (1915)
 Barranca abajo
 Cataplasma, by Enrique Buttaro
 El tiranuelo, by Pedro B. Aquino y Misia
 Pancha, la bava
 Luz de hoguera
 Entre gallos y medianoche, premiered at the Teatro Nuevo

References

External links
 

1888 births
1970 deaths
20th-century Uruguayan actresses
Actresses from Montevideo
Radio actresses
Argentine silent film actresses
Uruguayan film actresses
Uruguayan people of Portuguese descent
Uruguayan producers
Uruguayan radio actors
Uruguayan stage actresses
Women theatre managers and producers